Priidik Kroos (21 October 1889 Kreis Wiek – 1937 Soviet Union) was an Estonian politician. He was a member of the V Riigikogu, representing the Left-wing Workers. On 1 March 1934, he resigned his position and he was replaced by Aleksander Välison.

References

1889 births
1937 deaths
People from Kreis Wiek
Left-wing Workers politicians
Members of the Riigikogu, 1932–1934
Estonian emigrants to the Soviet Union
Estonian people executed by the Soviet Union
Great Purge victims from Estonia